Sir Charles Erskine, 1st Baronet (4 July 1643– 1690), of Alva, Fife,  was a Scottish politician who sat in the Scottish Conventions in 1665 and 1667 and in the Parliament of Scotland from 1689 to 1690.

Life
He was born in Alva House which had been built by his father in 1636.

Erskine was the third, but eldest surviving son of Sir Charles Erskine of Alva and Cambuskenneth, and his wife Mary Hope, daughter of Sir Thomas Hope, 1st Baronet of Craighall.  He succeeded his father as laird of Alva House on 8 July 1663 and purchased a baronetcy in Nova Scotia on 30 April 1666. Very few of the Nova Scotia baronets visited their lands, and the exercise was largely a money-raising exercise on the part of the Scottish Parliament, creating a new wave of baronets in the New World.

Erskine was returned as Shire Commissioner for Clackmannanshire to the Conventions  in 1665 and in 1667. In 1689 he was elected MP for Stirlingshire in the Scottish Parliament.
 
He was returned as Shire Commissioner for Stirlingshire in 1689.

Erskine died on 4 June 1690 aged 46.

Family

In about 1670 he married Christian Dundas, daughter of Sir James Dundas of Arniston (just south of Edinburgh).

They had at least four sons.
 Sir James Erskine, 2nd Baronet (c.1672-1693). He was killed at the Battle of Landen.
 Sir John Erskine, 3rd Baronet (1672-1739) Scottish Shire Commissioner and British Member of Parliament
 Robert Erskine (1677-1718) archiater (physician) to Peter the Great in Russia
 Charles Erskine, Lord Tinwald (1680-1763) Judge and Member of Parliament

His daughter Catherine married Patrick Campbell, Lord Monzie, one of the legal colleagues of her brother Lord Tinwald.

His grandchildren included James Erskine, Lord Alva.

References

1643 births
1690 deaths
Members of the Convention of the Estates of Scotland 1665
Members of the Convention of the Estates of Scotland 1667
Members of the Parliament of Scotland 1689–1702
Baronets in the Baronetage of Nova Scotia
Charles